The Army Group Boehn (German: Heeresgruppe Boehn) was an Army Group of the German Army, which operated on the Western Front under command of Max von Boehn, between 12 August 1918 and 8 October 1918 during World War I.

Composition 
 German 9th Army (Adolph von Carlowitz) (until 18 September)
 German 2nd Army (Georg von der Marwitz then Adolph von Carlowitz)
 German 18th Army (Oskar von Hutier)

Sources
The Soldier's Burden
Die Deutschen Heeresgruppen im Ersten Weltkrieg
: Die deutschen Heeresgruppen Teil 1, Erster Weltkrieg

Boehn
Military units and formations of Germany in World War I
Military units and formations established in 1918
Military units and formations disestablished in 1918